Ranald MacDougall (March 10, 1915 – December 12, 1973) was an American screenwriter who scripted such films as Mildred Pierce (1945), The Unsuspected (1947), June Bride (1948), and The Naked Jungle (1954), and shared screenwriting credit for 1963's Cleopatra. He also directed a number of films, including 1957's Man on Fire with Bing Crosby and 1959's The World, the Flesh and the Devil, both of which featured actress Inger Stevens.

Biography
Born in Schenectady, New York, MacDougall came from an impoverished working-class family. His father was a crane operator and union organizer, whose frequent strikes forced MacDougall to leave school before finishing the eighth grade to help support the family. He held a variety of odd jobs and during the Great Depression found work as an usher at Radio City Music Hall.

He saw greater potential across the street in Rockefeller Center, where he was hired as a page, working alongside Gregory Peck. As a page MacDougall had the opportunity to closely observe the radio industry, and in his spare time he wrote and submitted scripts to his boss under pseudonyms, and was finally hired as a staff writer for NBC Radio despite being underage at the time.

President, WGA
MacDougall was President of the Writers Guild of America West from 1971 until 1973.

Personal life
MacDougall was married to Lucille Brophy in 1939, by whom he had three children. Following their divorce, he married actress Nanette Fabray in 1957 by whom he had another son. He died of a heart attack in Pacific Palisades, California, at age 58.

References

External links

1915 births
1973 deaths
American male screenwriters
American people of Scottish descent
Screenwriters from New York (state)
Writers from Schenectady, New York
20th-century American male writers
20th-century American screenwriters